Haseenon Ka Devata is a 1971 Hindi-language drama film directed by Ravikant Nagaich, produced by Ram Dayal, with music composed by Laxmikant Pyarelal and songs penned by Anand Bakshi. The film stars Sanjay Khan, Rekha, Bindu and Helen.

Cast
Sanjay Khan ... Jai 
Rekha ... Sunita / Chhabili 
Sujit Kumar ... Gopal 
Bindu ... Silky 
Helen ... Casino Dancer
Mohan Choti ... Gypsy Chotu
Bela Bose ... Gypsy Woman
Kamal Kapoor ... Tony
 Brahm Bharadwaj ... Raja saheb
 Polson ... Gypsy Motu
 Ram Kamlani ... Adv. Mehta
 Ranjeet
 Ram Avtar ... Persian Sheikh
 Tiger Joginder ... Sheikh's bodyguard
 Rirkoo ... Sheikh's dwarf associate
 Coca-Cola ... Police Inspector 
 Suraj ... Ram Singh
 Rajan Kapoor ... Tony's associate
 Manju ... Bhola

Songs

External links
 

1971 films
1970s Hindi-language films
1971 drama films
Films scored by Laxmikant–Pyarelal
Films directed by Ravikant Nagaich